James Charles Leary (born August 26, 1973) is an American actor best known for his portrayal of the demon Clem who appears in Seasons Six and Seven of the television series Buffy the Vampire Slayer.

Filmography/television 
A Room Full of Nothing (2019) – David
Pure Shock Value (2009) – Julian Quintana
The Cabonauts, TV episode: "Game of the Week" (2009) – Jake
Unemployed (2008) – Dexter
Ladrón que roba a ladrón (2007) – Building Manager
Lovers, Liars & Lunatics (2006) – Policeman #1
The Comeback, TV episode: "Valerie Triumphs at the Upfronts" (2005) – Network Executive
Stunt C*cks (2004) – Bill
Buffy the Vampire Slayer, TV series (2001–2003; recurring) – Clem
Clay (2002)
Los Beltrán (1999) – Kevin Lynch
Chi Girl (1999) – 1st Sound Boy

Video games 
 Pirate101 – El Toro, Frogfather (voice)
 Wizard101 – King Pyat MourningSword, James T. Pork (voice)

External links 

Living people
American male television actors
20th-century American male actors
21st-century American male actors
1973 births